Acleris youngana is a species of moth of the family Tortricidae. It is found in North America, where it has been recorded from Alabama, Maine, New Hampshire, Ontario, Pennsylvania, Quebec, Vermont and West Virginia.

The wingspan is 15–18 mm. The forewings are light grey-brown with scattered black sprinkling. The hindwings are pale smoky. Adults have been recorded on wing from April to May and from October to November.

References

youngana
Moths of North America
Fauna of the Northeastern United States
Fauna of the Southeastern United States
Moths described in 1934